William Gaston Steele (December 17, 1820, Somerville, New Jersey – April 22, 1892, Somerville, New Jersey) was an American Democratic Party politician who represented New Jersey's 3rd congressional district from 1861 to 1865.

Steele was born in Somerville, New Jersey on December 17, 1820, where he attended the public schools and Somerville Academy. He engaged in banking.

Steele was elected as a Democrat to the Thirty-seventh and Thirty-eighth Congresses, serving in office from March 4, 1861 – March 3, 1865.  His vote on the Thirteenth Amendment is recorded as nay.

After leaving Congress, he engaged in the brokerage business. He died in Somerville on April 22, 1892, and was interred in Somerville Cemetery in Somerville.

External links

William Gaston Steele at The Political Graveyard

1820 births
1892 deaths
Democratic Party members of the United States House of Representatives from New Jersey
Politicians from Somerville, New Jersey
19th-century American politicians